Chaerilus is a genus of scorpions in the family Chaerilidae. They live in tropical parts of South Asia and Southeast Asia. A fossil genus Electrochaerilus is known from the Late Cretaceous (Cenomanian) aged Burmese amber.

Description
Total length is 15 to 75.4 mm. Orthobothriotaxy is type B. Pedipalp patella with 3 ventral trichobothria and pedipalp femur with 9 trichobothria. Ventral edge of cheliceral movable finger is crenulated. Ventrum of cheliceral fixed finger with denticle. Hemisperatophore fusiform. Pedipalp chela exhibits "8-carinae" configuration. Fifth metasomal segment consists with a single ventral carina. Legs are without tibial spurs. However prolateral and retrolateral pedal have spurs. Telson is without a subaculear tubercle.

Species
It contains the following species:

Chaerilus agilis Pocock, 1899
Chaerilus andamanensis Lourenço, Duhem & Leguin, 2011
Chaerilus annapurna Lourenço & Duhem, 2010
Chaerilus anneae Lourenço, 2012
Chaerilus assamensis Kraepelin, 1913
Chaerilus borneensis Simon, 1880
Chaerilus cavernicola Pocock, 1894
Chaerilus celebensis Pocock, 1894
Chaerilus ceylonensis Pocock, 1894
Chaerilus chapmani Vachon & Lourenço, 1985
Chaerilus cimrmani Kovařík, 2012
Chaerilus conchiformus Zhu, Han & Lourenço, 2008
Chaerilus dibangvalleycus Bastawade, 2006
Chaerilus granulatus Kovarík, Lowe, Hoferek, Forman & Král, 2015
Chaerilus hofereki Kovarik, Kral, Korinkova & Lerma, 2014
Chaerilus insignis Pocock, 1894
Chaerilus julietteae Lourenço, 2011
Chaerilus kampuchea Lourenço, 2012
Chaerilus laevimanus Pocock, 1899
Chaerilus laoticus Lourenço & Zhu, 2008
Chaerilus lehtrarensis Khatoon, 1999
Chaerilus longimanus Kovarík, Lowe, Hoferek, Forman & Král, 2015
Chaerilus mainlingensis Di & Zhu, 2009
Chaerilus petrzelkai Kovařík, 2000
Chaerilus ojangureni Kovařík, 2005
Chaerilus phami Lourenço, 2011
Chaerilus philippinus Lourenço & Ythier, 2008
Chaerilus pictus (Pocock, 1890)
Chaerilus rectimanus Pocock, 1899
Chaerilus robinsoni Hirst, 1911
Chaerilus sabinae Lourenço, 1995
Chaerilus seiteri Kovařík, 2012
Chaerilus sejnai Kovařík, 2005
Chaerilus solegladi Kovařík, 2012
Chaerilus spinatus Lourenço & Duhem, 2010
Chaerilus telnovi Lourenço, 2009
Chaerilus terueli Kovařík, 2012
Chaerilus tessellatus Qi, Zhu & Lourenço, 2005
Chaerilus thai Lourenço, Sun & Zhu, 2010
Chaerilus tichyi Kovařík, 2000
Chaerilus tricostatus Pocock, 1899
Chaerilus truncatus Karsch, 1879
Chaerilus tryznai Kovařík, 2000
Chaerilus variegatus Simon, 1877
Chaerilus vietnamicus Lourenço & Zhu, 2008
Chaerilus wrzecionkoi Kovařík, 2012

References

Scorpion genera
Chaerilidae
Fauna of Southeast Asia